The 2015 Christchurch Borough Council election took place on 7 May 2015 to elect members of Christchurch Borough Council in Dorset, England. The whole council was up for election and the Conservative party stayed in overall control of the council.

Background
After the last election in 2011 the Conservatives had a majority on the council with 21 seats, while independents had two seats and there was one Liberal Democrat. However the only Liberal Democrat councillor, Peter Hall of Town Cente ward, defected to the Conservatives in June 2011.

69 candidates stood in 2015 for the 24 seats on the council, including a full slate of 24 from the Conservatives. Labour had 20 candidates and the UK Independence Party 16,  up from 11 and 6 respectively in 2011. Other candidates were six from the Green party and three independents, including the two sitting councillors in Jumpers ward, Colin Bungey and Fred Neale. After the Liberal Democrats stood 11 candidates in 2011 they had no candidates in 2015, with the party's candidate for the Christchurch parliamentary constituency saying that the local party "wanted to concentrate on the general election campaign".

Three Conservative councillors, Mike Duckworth, Gillian Geary and Myra Mawbey, stood down at the election. Meanwhile, the election in North Highcliffe and Walkford ward was delayed until June 2015 after the death of one of the candidates.

Election result
The Conservatives remained in control of the council after winning 19 of the 22 seats contested in May. They lost one seat to the UK Independence Party, but retained all of the other seats they had been defending, including both seats in Town Centre ward where Peter Hall held his seat as a Conservative after his defection from the Liberal Democrats in 2011. The UK Independence Party gain came in Grange ward where Janet Abbott was elected and the party got an increased vote share across the council. Meanwhile, the only other seats not won by the Conservatives came in Jumpers where the two independent councillors, Colin Bungey and Fred Neale, held their seats.

The Conservatives also won both seats at the June delayed election in North Highcliffe and Walkford ward.

The above totals include the delayed election in North Highcliffe and Walkford.

Ward results

North Highcliffe and Walkford delayed election
The election in North Highcliffe and Walkford ward take place on 18 June 2015, delayed from 7 May when the rest of the council voted, after the death of Labour candidate Richard Walls. The two seats were won by Conservatives Sally Derham Wilkes and Nick Geary.

References

2015
2015 English local elections
May 2015 events in the United Kingdom